Sophie Herbrecht (born 13 February 1982 in Mulhouse) is a French handball player. She plays since June 2017 for the club Brest Bretagne Handball.

She became World Champion in 2003, when France won the 2003 World Women's Handball Championship in Croatia.

She represented France at the 2004 Summer Olympic Games in Athens, where the French team placed 4th, at the 2008 Summer Olympic Games in Beijing, where France placed 5th and at the 2012 Summer Olympics, where France also finished in 5th.

References

External links

1982 births
Living people
French female handball players
Olympic handball players of France
Handball players at the 2004 Summer Olympics
Handball players at the 2008 Summer Olympics
Handball players at the 2012 Summer Olympics
Sportspeople from Mulhouse
21st-century French women